Bathytoma prior is an extinct species of sea snail, a marine gastropod mollusk in the family Borsoniidae.

Distribution
This extinct marine species is endemic to New Zealand .

Description
The height of the shell attains 20 mm, its diameter 9 mm.

References

 P Vella, Tertiary Mollusca from south-east Wairarapa; Transactions of the Royal Society of New Zealand, 1954
 Maxwell, P.A. (2009). Cenozoic Mollusca. pp 232–254 in Gordon, D.P. (ed.) New Zealand inventory of biodiversity. Volume one. Kingdom Animalia: Radiata, Lophotrochozoa, Deuterostomia. Canterbury University Press, Christchurch.

prior
Gastropods of New Zealand